is a subway station in the Hirano-ku ward, city of Osaka, Osaka Prefecture, Japan.

Line
:

Layout
This station is located under Japan National Route 479, Osaka Prefectural Route 5 (Nanko-dori Street), and Hanshin Expressway Route 14 Matsubara Line. The station has an island platform serving two tracks.

References

External links

 Official Site 
 Official Site 

Hirano-ku, Osaka
Railway stations in Osaka
Railway stations in Japan opened in 1980
Osaka Metro stations